Eino Ilmari Heino (22 February 1912  – 10 May 1975) was a Finnish cinematographer. During his career, he received three Jussi Awards, two for feature films Linnaisten vihreä kamari (1945) and Loviisa – Niskavuoren nuori emäntä (1947) and one for a short film Jokapäiväistä leipäämme (1963).

Heino was married to actress Emma Väänänen.

Selected filmography 

 Kaikki rakastavat (1935)
 Koskenlaskijan morsian (1937)
 Juurakon Hulda (1937)
 Rikas tyttö (1939)
 In the Fields of Dreams (1940)
 Morsian yllättää (1941) 
 Sellaisena kuin sinä minut halusit (1944)
 Linnaisten vihreä kamari (1945)
 Ihmiset suviyössä (1948)
 Omena putoaa (1952)
 Nummisuutarit (1957)

References

External links

Finnish cinematographers
1912 births
1975 deaths